Comitas anteridion is a species of sea snail, a marine gastropod mollusc in the family Pseudomelatomidae, the turrids and allies.

Description
The high, narrow shell has a biconically fusiform shape. it is subscalar, with angularly convex and longitudinally ribbed whorls. It is  thin and tawny. 

Sculpture : Longitudinals—a little way below the suture is an angulation where narrow, raised, oblique ribs begin. These slope from right to left. They extend to the suture, but not to the base, where they die out more gradually than they arose. They are parted by rounded hollows, which are wider than the ribs. There are about nineteen of these ribs and hollows on the body whorl, but fewer on each preceding one. Besides these, there are very many fine hair-like flexuous lines of growth. Spirals —the shoulder below the suture (the sinus area) has a few faint regular scratchlike lines; on the ribbed area these are stronger. On the base the interstices become  somewhat narrower and more convex, till on the aperture they rise into strongish threads, which at the very point again become weaker. 

The colour of the shell is a light tawny, paler on the aperture, and white on the columella. 

The spire is high, conical, and slopingly subscalar. The protoconch is broken. The shell contains probably 10 whorls, rather short, with a straight somewhat drooping shoulder, convex, and appearing  contracted below in consequence of the dying out of the longitudinal ribs as they approach the suture. The conical base contracts rather rapidly, and is prolonged into the straight, very slightly reverted, direct, narrow, cylindrical aperture. The suture a fine, regular, squarely impressed line, whose course diverges a good deal from that of the spirals of sculpture. The aperture is club-shaped, being roundly oval and not angulated above, and with a long, narrow, slightly twisted siphonal canal below. The outer lip is sharp and thin, with a very regular curve from the suture to the base of the aperture, along the edge of which it runs sharp and straight to the
open, rounded, and thin point. When it leaves the body, it retires at once to the left, forming a deep, rounded, open sinus. From this point its edge sweeps out in a full convex curve, retreating slightly at the base of the aperture, and then advancing straight to the point. The inner lip is porcellanous, longitudinally marked, narrow, straight, cut away obliquely to a long fine point ; and then continued along the siphonal canal in a thin sharp edge, which toward the point is slightly cut off backwards.

Distribution
This marine species occurs off Cape of Good Hope,  South Africa.

References

 R.B. Watson, 1886; Preliminary Report on the Scaphopoda and Gasteropoda collected by the H. M. S. Challenger during the years 1873–76; Journal of the Linnean Society of London vol. XV p. 399
 A.W.B. Powell, 1966, 969. The family Turridae in the Indo-Pacific. Pt. 2. The subfamily Turriculinae. IndoPacific Mollusca 2 (10): 207-414
 R.N. Kilburn, Turridae (Mollusca: Gastropoda) of southern Africa and Mozambique. Part 3. Subfamily Borsoniinae; Ann. Natal Mus. Vol. 27(2), December 1986

External links
 

anteridion
Gastropods described in 1881